The Middleweight competition was the fourth heaviest class featured at the 2011 World Amateur Boxing Championships, held at the Heydar Aliyev Sports and Exhibition Complex.

Medalists

Seeds

  Abbos Atoev (first round)
  Andranik Hakobyan (quarterfinals)
  Jaime Cortez (second round)
  Artem Chebotarev (second round)
  Abdelmalek Rahou (first round)
  Michel Tavares (second round)
  Vijender Singh (first round)
  Darren O'Neill (quarterfinals)

Draw

Finals

Round of 128

Top half

Section 1

Section 2

Bottom half

Section 3

Section 4

External links
Draw

Middleweight